Miguel Alexander Hollman (born 10 June 1993) is an Argentine footballer who plays as a defender for Atlético María Grande.

Career
Hollman started in the youth system of local club Atlético María Grande, before joining Patronato in 2013. A year later, on 5 December 2014, Hollman made his professional league debut in a home loss versus Unión Santa Fe in Primera B Nacional. In the following years, he failed to feature for Patronato as the club won promotion to the Argentine Primera División in 2015; though was an unused substitute once in May 2016 for a goalless draw with Vélez Sarsfield. He departed Patronato in 2017 and subsequently had a short spell with ex-club and regional Liga de Paraná Campaña team Atlético María Grande.

On 31 July 2017, Atlético Paraná of Torneo Federal A signed Hollman. His first appearance arrived on 14 October against Sportivo Las Parejas. He left in 2017, which preceded a return to non-league outfit Atlético María Grande.

Career statistics
.

References

External links

1993 births
Living people
Sportspeople from Entre Ríos Province
Argentine footballers
Association football defenders
Primera Nacional players
Argentine Primera División players
Torneo Federal A players
Club Atlético Patronato footballers
Club Atlético Paraná players